Tatsuko (written: 立子, 竜子 or たつ子) is a feminine Japanese given name. Notable people with the name include:

, Japanese poet
, Japanese noble
, Japanese golfer

See also
Tatsuko (mythology), a mythological princess known for her beauty

Japanese feminine given names